Christopher Maloney or Chris Maloney may refer to:

 Christopher Maloney (born 1969), American singer-songwriter
 Chris Maloney (born 1961), American baseball coach
 Christopher Maloney (English singer) (born 1977)

See also

 Christopher Meloni (born 1961), American actor